Winaman (died 1040) was a nephew and follower of Sigfrid of Sweden. During Sigfrid's mission to convert Scandinavia to Christianity, Winaman and others (Unaman and Sunaman) were attacked and killed by pagan raiders.

He is a Catholic and Orthodox saint, feast day 15 February.

References

11th-century Christian saints